Rhacophorus baluensis (common name: Balu flying frog) is a species of frog in the family Rhacophoridae found in northern Sabah and Sarawak in Malaysian Borneo. It is likely to be found in northern Kalimantan. Its natural habitats are submontane and montane forests. Male frogs gather at small ponds. It is potentially threatened by habitat loss caused by logging.

References

External links
 Sound recordings of Rhacophorus baluensis at BioAcoustica

baluensis
Amphibians of Malaysia
Endemic fauna of Malaysia
Endemic fauna of Borneo
Taxonomy articles created by Polbot
Amphibians described in 1954
Amphibians of Borneo